The 2008 Canadian Major Indoor Soccer League (CMISL) season had each team playing 10 games. The schedule however was unbalanced as both the Edmonton Drillers and Saskatoon Accelerators played six home games and two road games and two at a neutral site, while the Calgary United FC played five home games and five road games. The games held at the Stampede Corral were unique as they were featured in a round-robin style with all CMISL teams participating. Due to scheduling concerns at the MTS Centre, the Winnipeg Alliance FC were a road-only franchise, playing all 10 of their games away from home.

The playoff was a one game "winner-takes-all" championship game. It was played between the first and second place teams in St. Albert at the Servus Centre on March 14, 2008. The Edmonton Drillers defeated Calgary United FC by a score of 8-7.

Teams

Exhibition Schedule

Regular Season Schedule

Playoff Schedule

Standings

Canadian Major Indoor Soccer League
Indoor
Canadian Major Indoor Soccer League seasons